Knickerbocker Holiday is a 1944 American musical film directed by Harry Joe Brown and starring Nelson Eddy, Charles Coburn and Constance Dowling. It is based on the musical play of the same title set in the 17th century colony of New Amsterdam. The film's sets were designed by the art director Bernard Herzbrun. The music by Werner R. Heymann was nominated for an Oscar for best motion picture score.

Plot

Cast
 Nelson Eddy as Brom Broeck  
 Charles Coburn as Peter Stuyvesant  
 Constance Dowling as Tina Tienhoven  
 Ernest Cossart as Tienhoven  
 Shelley Winters as Ulda Tienhoven  
 Johnnie Davis as Tenpin  
 Percy Kilbride as Schermerhorn  
 Otto Kruger as Roosevelt 
 Fritz Feld as Poffenburgh  
 Richard Hale as Tammany  
 Carmen Amaya as Gypsy Dancer
 Chester Conklin as Town Trumpeter (uncredited)

References

Bibliography
 May, Lary. The Big Tomorrow: Hollywood and the Politics of the American Way. University of Chicago Press, 2002.

External links

1944 films
American historical musical films
1940s historical musical films
Films based on works by Washington Irving
Films directed by Harry Joe Brown
Films set in the 1640s
American black-and-white films
1940s English-language films
1940s American films
United Artists films